Andrea Gemignani (born 13 February 1996) is an Italian footballer who plays as a right back for  club Arzignano.

Club career
He made his Serie C debut for Pontedera on 12 September 2015 in a game against Tuttocuoio.

On 6 November 2020, he joined Livorno as a free agent.

On 4 August 2021, he signed with Seregno.

On 7 September 2022, Gemignani moved to Arzignano on a two-year contract.

References

External links
 
 
 

1996 births
Living people
Sportspeople from Lucca
Italian footballers
Serie C players
Empoli F.C. players
U.S. Città di Pontedera players
S.P.A.L. players
U.S. Gavorrano players
A.S. Sambenedettese players
U.S. Alessandria Calcio 1912 players
U.S. Livorno 1915 players
U.S. 1913 Seregno Calcio players
F.C. Arzignano Valchiampo players
Association football defenders
Italy youth international footballers
Footballers from Tuscany